The United States Army Intelligence Center of Excellence (USAICoE) is the United States Army's school for professional training of military intelligence personnel.  It is a component of United States Army Training and Doctrine Command (TRADOC).

History

The center was relocated from Ft. Holabird, Maryland to Fort Huachuca, Arizona in 1971. The move involved more than 120 moving vans, a unit train and several aircraft.  The initial intelligence training facilities were a World War II hospital complex that had not been occupied in several years.

Training
The school conducts resident courses for enlisted, warrant officer, and commissioned officer personnel, as well as for international military students in military exchange programs.  United States Army personnel who train at the school become members of the Military Intelligence Corps. AIT students training to become Systems Maintainers (42 weeks), Intelligence Analysts (16 weeks), Human Intelligence Collectors (19 weeks), Geospatial Intelligence Imagery Analyst (22 weeks), UAS Operators (23 weeks), and Special Agents with United States Army Counterintelligence, all receive training here.

Military Intelligence Hall of Fame
The school also administers the Military Intelligence Hall of Fame.

List of commanders

 MG John M. Custer III, 29 June 2007
 MG Gregg C. Potter, 8 December 2010
 MG Robert P. Ashley, 19 April 2013
 MG Scott D. Berrier, 31 July 2015
 MG Robert P. Walters Jr., 14 July 2017
 MG Laura A. Potter, 19 July 2019
 MG Anthony R. Hale, 12 August 2020

See also
 National Intelligence University
 Mercyhurst University Institute for Intelligence Studies
 Camp Peary
 United States Army Military Intelligence

In other countries
 Canadian Forces School of Military Intelligence
 Defence College of Intelligence

References

External links
  Intelligence Center Online Network
 University of Military Intelligence
 Fort Huachuca

Education in Cochise County, Arizona
Training installations of the United States Army
Military education and training in the United States
Military in Arizona
Military intelligence
Intelligence education
Military units and formations established in 1971